Rachel Belle is a Seattle radio personality. She is originally from Pleasanton, California and attended California State University, Chico.

Her podcast Your Last Meal, begun in 2016, was nominated for a James Beard Award in 2018. The podcast also reached iTunes top position for food podcasts  2018. During the COVID-19 pandemic, she began a social media-based virtual cooking club.

Belle received the 2018 Edward R. Murrow Award for Feature Reporting for her story on the homeless Girl Scout troop at Mary's Place, a Seattle women's shelter.

References

Sources
  via The Monarch Review

Further reading

External links

American podcasters
American radio journalists
American women radio journalists
California State University, Chico alumni
Living people
People from Pleasanton, California
Radio personalities from Seattle
Year of birth missing (living people)
American women podcasters
21st-century American women